Ennathe Kannaiah (1925 - 7 August 2012) was a comedian who appeared in Tamil-language films. In the Ravichandran-Jayalalita starrer Naan, as he spoke his dialogues, he frequently used the word Ennathe and this became his nickname. Decades later, he became even better known for his dialogue, Varuum... Aanaa Varaadhu....

Film career
After debuting in the Tamil film Ezhai Padum Padu in 1950, he acted in more than 250 films. He predominantly was cast in supporting roles in films of M.G.Ramachandran like Nam Naadu (1969), En Annan (1970), Thedi Vandha Mapillai (1970) and others. He later starred in films including Rajinikanth's Thambikku Entha Ooru (1984). The scenes in which he appeared as a mahout were popular in the 1980s. Though he has made many films, he became famous for his dialogue in Thottal Poo Malarum (2007) (Varum, Aanaa Varaadhu...) with Vadivelu.

Partial filmography

Death
He died on 7 August 2012.

References

External links 
 

Tamil comedians
2012 deaths
1925 births
Date of birth missing
Place of birth missing
Male actors in Tamil cinema